In organic chemistry, isocyanate is the functional group with the formula . Organic compounds that contain an isocyanate group are referred to as isocyanates.  An organic compound with two isocyanate groups is known as a diisocyanate. Diisocyanates are manufactured for the production of polyurethanes, a class of polymers.

Isocyanates should not be confused with cyanate esters and isocyanides, very different families of compounds.  The cyanate (cyanate ester) functional group is arranged differently from the isocyanate group. Isocyanides have the connectivity , lacking the oxygen of the cyanate groups.

Structure and bonding
In terms of bonding, isocyanates are closely related to carbon dioxide (CO2) and carbodiimides (C(NR)2).  The C−N=C=O unit that defines isocyanates is planar, and the N=C=O linkage is nearly linear.  In phenyl isocyanate, the C=N and C=O distances are respectively 1.195 and 1.173 Å.  The C-N=C angle is 134.9° and the N=C=O angle is 173.1°.

Production 
Isocyanates are usually produced from amines by phosgenation, i.e. treating with phosgene:
RNH2 + COCl2 -> RNCO  +  2 HCl
These reactions proceed via the intermediacy of a carbamoyl chloride.  Owing to the hazardous nature of phosgene, the production of isocyanates requires special precautions.

Another route to isocyanates entails addition of isocyanic acid to alkenes.  Complementarily, alkyl isocyanates form by displacement reactions involving alkyl halides and alkali metal cyanates.

Three rearrangement reactions involving nitrenes give isocyanates:
 Schmidt reaction, a reaction where a carboxylic acid is treated with ammonia and hydrazoic acid yielding an isocyanate.
 Curtius rearrangement degradation of an acyl azide to an isocyanate and nitrogen gas.
 Lossen rearrangement, the conversion of a hydroxamic acid to an isocyanate via the formation of an O-acyl, sulfonyl, or phosphoryl intermediate.

Reactivity

With nucleophiles 
Isocyanates are electrophiles, and as such they are reactive toward a variety of nucleophiles including alcohols, amines, and even water having a higher reactivity compared to structurally analogous isothiocyanates.

Upon treatment with an alcohol, an isocyanate forms a urethane linkage:
 ROH + R'NCO -> ROC(O)N(H)R' 

where R and R' are alkyl or aryl groups.
If a diisocyanate is treated with a compound containing two or more hydroxyl groups, such as a diol or a polyol, polymer chains are formed, which are known as polyurethanes.

Isocyanates react with water to form carbon dioxide:
 RNCO + H2O -> RNH2 + CO2
This reaction is exploited in tandem with the production of polyurethane to give polyurethane foams.  The carbon dioxide functions as a blowing agent.

Isocyanates also react with amines to give ureas:
 R2NH + R'NCO -> R2NC(O)N(H)R'
The addition of an isocyanate to a urea gives a biuret:
 R2NC(O)N(H)R' + R''NCO -> R2NC(O)NR'C(O)NHR''
Reaction between a di-isocyanate and a compound containing two or more amine groups produces long polymer chains known as polyureas.

Carbodiimides are produced by the decarboxylation of alkyl and aryl isocyanate using phosphine oxides as a catalyst:
C6H11NCO -> (C6H11N)2C  +  CO2

Cyclization 
Isocyanates also can react with themselves. Aliphatic diisocyanates can trimerise to from substituted isocyanuric acid groups. This can be seen in the formation of polyisocyanurate resins (PIR) which are commonly used as rigid thermal insulation. Isocyanates participate in Diels–Alder reactions, functioning as dienophiles.

Rearrangement reactions 
Isocyanates are common intermediates in the synthesis of primary amines via hydrolysis:
 Hofmann rearrangement, a reaction in which a primary amide is treated with a strong oxidizer such as sodium hypobromite or lead tetraacetate to form an isocyanate intermediate.

Common isocyanates 

The global market for diisocyanates in the year 2000 was 4.4 million tonnes, of which 61.3% was methylene diphenyl diisocyanate (MDI), 34.1% was toluene diisocyanate (TDI), 3.4% was the total for hexamethylene diisocyanate (HDI) and isophorone diisocyanate (IPDI), and 1.2% was the total for various others.  A monofunctional isocyanate of industrial significance is methyl isocyanate (MIC), which is used in the manufacture of pesticides.

Common applications 
MDI is commonly used in the manufacture of rigid foams and surface coating. Polyurethane foam boards are used in construction for insulation. TDI is commonly used in applications where flexible foams are used, such as furniture and bedding. Both MDI and TDI are used in the making of adhesives and sealants due to weather-resistant properties. Isocyanates, both MDI and TDI are widely used in as spraying applications of insulation due to the speed and flexibility of applications. Foams can be sprayed into structures and harden in place or retain some flexibility as required by the application. HDI is commonly utilized in high-performance surface-coating applications, including automotive paints.

Health and safety 
The risks of isocyanates was brought to the world's attention with the Bhopal disaster, which caused the death of nearly 4000 people from the inadvertent release of methyl isocyanate (MIC) gas into the surrounding environs.

LD50s for isocyanates are typically several hundred milligrams per kilogram. Despite this low acute toxicity, an extremely low short-term exposure limit (STEL) of 0.07 mg/m3 is the legal limit for all isocyanates (except methyl isocyanate: 0.02 mg/m3) in the United Kingdom. These limits are set to protect workers from chronic health effects such as occupational asthma, contact dermatitis, or irritation of the respiratory tract.

Since they are used in spraying applications, the properties of their aerosols have attracted attention. In the U.S., OSHA conducted a National Emphasis Program on isocyanates starting in 2013 to make employers and workers more aware of the health risks. 
Polyurethanes have variable curing times, and the presence of free isocyanates in foams vary accordingly.

Both the US National Toxicology Program (NTP) and International Agency for Research on Cancer (IARC) have evaluated TDI as a potential human carcinogen and Group 2B "possibly carcinogenic to humans". MDI appears to be relatively safer and is unlikely a human carcinogen. The IARC evaluates MDI as Group 3 "not classifiable as to its carcinogenicity in humans".

All major producers of MDI and TDI are members of the International Isocyanate Institute, which promotes the safe handling of MDI and TDI.

Hazards

Toxicity 
Isocyanates can present respiratory hazards as particulates, vapors or aerosols. Autobody shop workers are a very commonly examined population for isocyanate exposure as they are repeatedly exposed when spray painting automobiles and can be exposed when installing truck bed liners. Hypersensitivity pneumonitis has slower onset and features chronic inflammation that can be seen on imaging of the lungs. Occupational asthma is a worrisome outcome of respiratory sensitization to isocyanates as it can be acutely fatal. Diagnosis of occupational asthma is generally performed using pulmonary function testing (PFT) and performed by pulmonology or occupational medicine physicians. Occupational asthma is much like asthma in that it causes episodic shortness of breath and wheezing. Both the dose and duration of exposure to isocyanates can lead to respiratory sensitization. Dermal exposures to isocyanates can sensitize an exposed person to respiratory disease.

Dermal exposures can occur via mixing, spraying coatings or applying and spreading coatings manually. Dermal exposures to isocyanates is known to lead to respiratory sensitization. Even when the right personal protective equipment (PPE) is used, exposures can occur to body areas not completely covered. Isocyanates can also permeate improper PPE, necessitating frequent changes of both disposable gloves and suits if they become over exposed.

Flammability 
Methyl isocyanate (MIC) is highly flammable. MDI and TDI are much less flammable. Flammability of materials is a consideration in furniture design. The specific flammability hazard is noted on the safety data sheet (SDS) for specific isocyanates.

Hazard controls 

Elimination and substitution seeks to eliminate a hazard directly from use in industrial processes. Elimination if possible also has the possibility of eliminating the need for other controls. If unable to make an elimination, substituting a less hazardous isocyanate may also control hazards. Because of the hazards inherent in isocyanates, there is ongoing research for suitable replacements. The EPA has sponsored work on finding suitable replacements for isocyanates in polyurethane coatings.

Engineering controls seek to decrease hazards by creating barriers to hazard exposure. Using the source–pathway–receptor model, an engineering control acts on the pathway to mitigate hazards emanating from the source from reaching the receptor.  An automated spraying booth with a separate ventilation system would be an example of engineering controls. Appropriate ventilation is a common engineering control when using isocyanates.

Administrative controls are policy or training based controls to decrease hazards. A quarterly training session on recognizing symptoms of occupational asthma or proper respirator use would be examples of administrative controls. Administrative controls can be effective in reducing hazards for which personal protective equipment does not exist, for example, no eating or smoking in work areas can prevent ingestion of hazardous chemicals. Training is required by OSHA

Personal protective equipment (PPE) is the lowest level of hazard control. For isocyanates commonly used, PPE include respirators for inhalation hazards and gloves to minimize absorption of dermal hazards. PPE like respirators are sensitive to fit and require some maintenance periodically. In some autobody paint and clear-coat spraying applications exposure limits exceed the protection factor of half mask respirators, and a full-face mask is required. Eye protection is an important component of PPE. Gloves and coveralls are appropriate personal protective equipment for workers. Gloves and protective clothing can be effective in reducing dermal exposures, but user resistance can arise due to loss of tactile sensation or increased thermal burden. The material and thickness of gloves are an important component of protection.

Industrial hygiene 
Exposure assessment is the domain of industrial hygienists. An objective of exposure assessment is to ensure regulatory compliance with occupational exposure limits (OELs) below. OSHA guidelines provide detailed technical guidance on measuring isocyanates by sampling and analytics procedures tailored to specific chemicals. In the case of MDI, sample is by glass-fiber filters at standard air flow rates and liquid chromatography.

Occupational health surveillance is primarily the domain of medical professionals. This can include counseling, respirator fit testing, tracking of biologic exposure using biologic exposure indices (BEI) and PFT results. Biologic monitoring levels for isocyanates exist but may not be commonly used. One example of a monitoring program by the United States Navy relies on pulmonary function testing and screening questionnaires.

The combination of industrial hygiene and medical surveillance can have a significant effect on the incidence of occupational asthma.

Emergency management is a complex process of preparation and should be considered in a setting where a release of bulk chemicals may threaten the well-being of the public.  The Bhopal disaster involving release of MIC and resulting in the deaths of thousands of people and affecting hundreds of thousands more. As a result of major industrial incidents like this, public health officials have proposed disaster preparedness programs aimed at assessing hazards, prevention by engineering and coordinated responses. More recently MIC was involved in an explosion at a pesticide manufacturing plant in West Virginia.

Occupational exposure limits 
Exposure limits can be expressed as ceiling limits, a maximal value, short-term exposure limits (STEL), a 15-minute exposure limit or an 8-hour time-weighted average limit (TWA). Below is a sampling, not exhaustive, as less common isocyanates also have specific limits within the United States, and in some regions there are limits on total isocyanate, which recognizes some of the uncertainty regarding the safety of mixtures of chemicals as compared to pure chemical exposures. For example, while there is no OEL for HDI, NIOSH has a REL of 5 ppb for an 8-hour TWA and a ceiling limit of 20 ppb, consistent with the recommendations for MDI.

Regulation

United States 
The Occupational Safety and Health Administration (OSHA) is the regulatory body covering worker safety. OSHA puts forth permissible exposure limit (PEL) 20 ppb for MDI and detailed technical guidance on exposure assessment.

The National Institutes of Health (NIOSH) is the agency responsible for providing the research and recommendations regarding workplace safety, while OSHA is more of an enforcement body. NIOSH is responsible for producing the science that can result in recommended exposure limits (REL), which can be lower than the PEL. OSHA is tasked with enforcement and defending the enforceable limits (PELs). In 1992, when OSHA reduced the PEL for TDI to the NIOSH REL, the PEL reduction was challenged in court, and the reduction was reversed.

The Environmental Protection Agency (EPA) is also involved in the regulation of isocyanates with regard to the environment and also non-worker persons that might be exposed.

The TLV is not an OSHA-enforceable value, unless the PEL is the same.

European Union 
The European Chemicals Agency (ECHA) provides regulatory oversight of chemicals used within the European Union. ECHA has been implementing policy aimed at limiting worker exposure through elimination by lower allowable concentrations in products and mandatory worker training, an administrative control. Within the European Union, many nations set their own occupational exposure limits for isocyanates.

International groups 
The United Nations, through the World Health Organization (WHO) together with the International Labour Organization (ILO) and United Nations Environment Programme (UNEP), collaborate on the International Programme on Chemical Safety (IPCS) to publish summary documents on chemicals. The IPCS published one such document in 2000 summarizing the status of scientific knowledge on MDI.

The IARC evaluates the hazard data on chemicals and assigns a rating on the risk of carcinogenesis. In the case of TDI, the final evaluation is possibly carcinogenic to humans (Group 2B). For MDI, the final evaluation is not classifiable as to its carcinogenicity to humans (Group 3).

The International Isocyanate Institute is an international industry consortium that seeks promote the safe utilization of isocyanates by promulgating best practices.

See also 
 Isothiocyanate
 Polymethylene polyphenylene isocyanate

References

External links 
 NIOSH Safety and Health Topic: Isocyanates, from the website of the National Institute for Occupational Safety and Health (NIOSH)
 Health and Safety Executive, website of the UK Health and Safety Executive, useful search terms on this site — isocyanates, MVR, asthma
 International Isocyanate Institute | dii  International Isocyanate Institute
 [web.archive.org/web/20170611085642/http://www.actsafe.ca/wp-content/uploads/resources/pdf/Isocyanates.pdf  Safe Working Procedure for Isocyanate-Containing Products], June 200
 Isocyanates – Measurement Methodology, Exposure and Effects, Swedish National Institute for Working Life Workshop (1999)
 Health and Safety Executive, Guidance Note (EH16) Isocyanates: Toxic Hazards and Precautions (1984)
 The Society of the Plastics Industry – Technical Bulletin AX119 MDI-Based Polyurethane
 Foam Systems: Guidelines for Safe Handling and Disposal (1993)
 An occupational hygiene assessment of the use and control of isocyanates in the UK by Hilary A Cowie et al.  HSE Research Report RR311/2005.  Prepared by the Institute of Occupational Medicine for the Health and Safety Executive

 
Functional groups
Commodity chemicals
Occupational safety and health